Repent Replenish Repeat is the third studio album by Dan le Sac Vs Scroobius Pip, released on 7 October 2013. It peaked at number 22 on the UK Albums Chart.

Critical reception
At Metacritic, which assigns a weighted average score out of 100 to reviews from mainstream critics, the album received an average score of 66% based on 5 reviews, indicating "generally favorable reviews".

Peter Adkins of Clash gave the album a 6 out of 10, calling it "their most mixed work to date." Meanwhile, Fintan Burke of State said, "it's good to see them bring their individual efforts together to fortify what is nevertheless a competent return to form."

Track listing

UK edition does not include "Kickstarter".

Charts

References

External links
 

2013 albums
Dan le Sac Vs Scroobius Pip albums
Strange Famous Records albums